Dysdera castillonensis is a species of spider in the genus Dysdera, family Dysderidae. The species, endemic to Spain, was first described by Miguel Ferrández in 1996.

No subspecies are listed by the World Spider Catalog.

References 

Dysderidae
Spiders described in 1996